The Lebanese Broadcasting Corporation International, widely known as LBCI, is a private television station in Lebanon. LBCI was founded in 1992 by acquiring the assets, liabilities and logo of LBC, an entity founded in 1985 during the Lebanese Civil War by the Lebanese Forces militia. LBCI went global in 1996 when it launched its satellite channel LBC Al-Fadha'iya Al-Lubnaniya covering Lebanon, the Arab world, Europe, America, Australia and Africa.

History

Post-war era
The Lebanese Forces, a Lebanese militia that had founded LBC in 1985, was militarily and financially weakened by Lebanese civil war which ended in 1990 and its leader Samir Geagea was imprisoned in 1994. In 1992, Pierre El Daher had founded LBCI along with other shareholders and registered it at the Commercial Register of Baabda.

In April 1996, El Daher and other shareholders launched LBCsat, a free satellite channel. The new channel was a success, especially to the Lebanese diaspora, disseminated throughout the world.

In 2003, as a result of an agreement between Saleh Kamel, founder of LMH company (Lebanese Media Holding, owner of 49% of LBC SAT and Pac's shares) and Saudi prince Al Waleed bin Talal, the latter, through Kingdom, replaced Kamel in LMH.

By the end of 2008, it was decided to increase the capital of LMH considerably. Accordingly, Al-Waleed Bin Talal became the largest shareholder after acquiring the absolute majority in PAC (a content provider for both LBCI and LBC SAT) and LBC SAT, based on an understanding that the capital increase would be invested to improve the programs’ network and upgrade productivity under the supervision of Sheikh Pierre Daher.

In 2010, Rupert Murdoch joined the group and PAC and LBC SAT were merged with Rotana. Rumor was that this merger would improve and develop the group, which seemed an obvious result of the cooperation between the Saudi prince and the owner of the biggest media empire in the world, Rupert Murdoch. These expectations did not materialize.

Al Hayat and LBC SAT merger
At the end of the year 2002, LBC SAT and the London-based Al Hayat newspaper owned by Saudis, merged their news programs. LBC SAT daily news bulletin was called the "Al Hayat-LBC SAT news bulletin". The cooperation ended in 2010.

Television channels

Domestic
 LBCI – a local channel for Lebanese viewers broadcasting a variety of programs of different genres.
LB2 (formerly known as LBCI Drama) – a local channel dedicated to around the clock reruns of entertainment shows and series.

International
LBC Europe – an international version of LBCI targeted to Lebanese citizens in Europe.
LBC America – the international version of LBCI is targeted at Lebanese citizens in America.

In December 2019, LBCI announced that the LDC brand will be discontinued by the beginning of the year 2020 and that all programs will be broadcast via LBCI. The main reason behind the decision is that the LDC branding is no longer needed since the battle for the LBC brand and channels with Al Walid Bin Talal has been resolved and won by LBCI current owner, Pierre El Daher.

Defunct
Lebanese Diaspora Channel (LDC) – an international version of LBCI targeted to Lebanese in diaspora countries. 
LBCI News – local channel that focuses on broadcasting the most actual news.
LBCI HD – Lebanon's first HD channel, broadcasting LBCI programs in high definition.
LBC Australia – the international version of LBCI is targeted at Lebanese citizens in Australia.
LBC Africa – the international version of LBCI is targeted at Lebanese in Africa.
LBC Maghreb – international version of LBCI targeted at Lebanese citizens in the Middle East and North Africa.

Logos

Popular programs
LBCI has produced many popular shows including: Little Big Stars, Star Academy Arab World, Ya Katel Ya Maktoul (Arabic version of Greed), Miss Lebanon, Hellha wo Ehtalha (Arabic version of French TV Show Fort Boyard), Survivor Middle East, El Wadi (Arabic version of The Farm), The Perfect Bride and Mission Fashion.

Its most famous talk show is Kalam Ennas hosted by Marcel Ghanem. The show, which originally aired on C33, moved to LBC after C33 was shut down in the mid-1990s. Another famous show is BassMat Watan  ; a pun in Lebanese for either "The smiles of the homeland" or "When the nation died", depending on how people see the joke of this title), a sketch-comedy show that deals with politics and current events.

 Project Runway
 Arabs Idol
 Arabs Got Talent
 take me out
 Star Academy
 The Voice
 Helha wo Ehtalha
 lahon w bass
 Ahmar Bel Khat El Arid
 The Winner Is
 Comicaze
 Altareekh Yashhad
 Kalam Ennas
 Hki Jales
 Almoutaham
 Horoub W Iman
 Asmaa min al tareeekh
 Ahla Jalse
 Akhbar.com
 Nharkom Said
 Celebrity Duets
 Top Chef Middle East
 Beirut I Love You
 Arqam Btehki
 In Touch
 Basmat Watan
 Douma Kratiya
 Ktir Salbe Show
 A stand up comedy revolution
 Helwi w Murra
 Zefou El Arous
 Lezim Taaref
 Kids Power
 Nehna Labaad
 Bala Mazeh
 The Brothers Grunt on MTV
 Tele Auto
 Inside Game
 Star Academy Arab World
 Yalla NY
 Istiqsaa
 Safha Jdeede
 Sunday Mass
 Splash
 Chou el ossa
 Miss Universe
 Miss Lebanon
 Zeffo El Aroos
 Aayle A Fared Mayle
 Mission Fashion
 Survivor
 Alwady
 La boutique
 Min el alb
 The hangers
 Chakhseye aw ghaneye
 Mesh Ana
 Chawareh Al Zill
 Al Haram
 Al Armala W Al Shaytan
 Jamil and Jamileh
 Talamith Akher Zaman
 Maitre Nada
 Ghanoujet Baya
 Noktit Hob
 BBCHI
 Gladiators
 Tele Auto
 Motorsports
 Kif w lech
 Perfect Bride

LBCI personalities

 Ghayath Dibra
 Malek Maktabi
 Nicole Hajal
 Yazbek Wehbe
 Raneem Bou Khazam
 Remy Derbas
 Maroun Nassif
 Edmond Sassine
 Albert Kostanian
 Joe Kareh
 Melissa Akoury

See also
 Television in Lebanon

References

External links
 

1985 establishments in Lebanon
Television channels and stations established in 1985
Arabic-language television stations
Television networks in Lebanon
Television stations in Lebanon